1990-1996 is the second compilation album by Japanese rock band The Mad Capsule Markets. Rather than rerecording the old songs such as on the previous compilation album The Mad Capsule Markets, this album has collected remastered songs from Humanity through 4 Plugs, some with 'xxxx' noises or added interludes.

Track listing

Notes
The original video to Karakuri No Soko was censored on the release of the 1990-1996 DVD, as on the original version, the opening included footage of Hitler's Germany, images of concentration camps and scenes from the banned cartoon Private Snafu. This was likely to have been done as Mad Capsule Markets didn't want to offend their overseas fanbase (although the DVD wasn't released overseas).

The Mad Capsule Markets albums
2004 compilation albums